John Brugman, O.F.M., was a 15th-century Franciscan friar, who became a renowned preacher in the Netherlands

Biography
Brugman was born at Kempen in the Electorate of Cologne, towards the end of the preceding century; died at Nijmegen, Netherlands, 19 September 1473.
 
Brugman became a lector of theology, Vicar Provincial and one of the founders of the Cologne Province of the Observants, a reformed branch of the  Friars Minor. For twenty years his name was celebrated as the most illustrious preacher of the Low Countries. The saying still exists in that region, "to speak like Brugman", meaning to speak eloquently. A friend of Denis the Carthusian, it was at his suggestion that the latter wrote his work: De doctrinâ et regulis vitae Christianæ, dedicating it to Brugman.
 
Brugman also supported the foundation of the Brothers of the Common Life, a congregation, devoted to the interests of education, established by two priests, Gerhard Groote and Florentius Radewiyns. He addressed them in the two letters which are still extant to strengthen them in the persecution to which they were subjected.
 
Brugman died in the odour of sanctity and is commemorated in the Martyrologium Minoritico-Belgicum on 19 September.

Works

Brugman wrote two lives of St. Lidwina, the first of which, printed at Cologne in 1433, was reprinted anonymously at Louvain in 1448. The second life appeared at Schiedam in 1498. Both included by the Bollandists in the Acta Sanctorum for 2 April.
 
Brugman also wrote a devout "Life of Jesus."
 
Brugman ranked among the best poets of his day. Two of his poems "O Ewich is so lanc!" and "The Zielejacht" are included by Hoffmann von Fallersleben in his "Horae Belgicae" (II, 36, 41.).
 
Brugman's life was written by Willem Moll under the title "Joannes Brugman en het Godsdienstegen Leven Onzer Vaderen in de Vijftiende eeuw", and published at Amsterdam in 1854. It consists of two volumes, the second containing Brugman's unedited works.

References

Sources
 Catholic Encyclopedia

14th-century births
1473 deaths
People from Viersen (district)
People from the Electorate of Cologne
German Friars Minor
15th-century German Roman Catholic priests
15th-century German poets
Writers from North Rhine-Westphalia
German male poets
Burials in the Netherlands